Guatemala is divided into 22 departments (Spanish: departamentos)
which are in turn divided into 340 municipalities.

In addition, Guatemala has claimed that all or part of the nation of Belize is a department of Guatemala, and this claim is sometimes reflected in maps of the region. Guatemala formally recognized Belize in 1991, but the border disputes between the two nations have not been resolved.

Departments

See also
ISO 3166-2:GT

References

External resources 
Interactive map of Guatemalan departments and municipalities
statoid site

 
Subdivisions of Guatemala
Guatemala, Departments
Guatemala 1
Departments, Guatemala
Guatemala geography-related lists